Moxy Früvous was a Canadian politically satirical folk-pop band from Thornhill, Ontario, Canada. The band was founded in 1989, and was active until 2001.  Common themes in Früvous songs include Canada and the "human experience".

History
The band formed in 1989 when Jian Ghomeshi (then going by Jean Ghomeshi), Murray Foster and Mike Ford, former classmates at the local Thornlea Secondary School and playing in a pub band called The Chia Pets at the time, joined with David Matheson to busk in Toronto. They drew crowds, and, eventually, the attention of Toronto-based CBC Radio, which commissioned songs about political and local issues for the radio show Later the Same Day. Some songs written for the show later appeared on their albums; these songs include "The Gulf War Song" and "My Baby Loves a Bunch of Authors", which was written for a Toronto authors' festival.

They cut a six-song demo tape in 1992, and that year performed at the SOCAN Awards celebration.  Their first major-label album, Bargainville, was released the next year. Shortly after, they embarked on a touring schedule that continued, practically without stopping except to record new material, until the end of 2000.

On August 14, 1997, their song "You Will Go to the Moon" was used by NASA to wake the crew of STS-85.

The band sometimes sang with little or no accompaniment in a style similar to contemporary a cappella. A number of their songs also express the band's progressive political leanings ("The Greatest Man in America", for instance, mocks Rush Limbaugh, and "Big Fish" lambastes former Premier of Ontario Mike Harris). Früvous was also known for their close relationship with their fans and their live shows, which were full of political commentary, humorous banter, and musical improvisation.

The band gave its last concert in 2000 (excepting a performance at an annual fan convention in 2001).

Post-breakup activity
On September 5, 2005, Ford, Foster and Ghomeshi performed on CIUT, the U of T's campus radio station, as part of the morning program Toronto Unlocked, an ad hoc program produced and hosted by locked-out CBC Radio One staff.

The last update to the band's website occurred on July 8, 2008. The website was replaced by a default webserver page in mid-2009. The page eventually returned, and as of April 10, 2022 was still available.

Ghomeshi, Foster, and Ford performed on CBC Radio One on March 1, 2010, as a goodbye to Metro Morning host Andy Barrie.

In late 2014, Ghomeshi was arrested and charged with four counts of sexual assault, and one count of choking, in relation to three complainants. He was charged with three additional counts related to three more women on January 8, 2015.

On October 31, 2014, Murray Foster posted an "official response from the other former Moxy Fruvous members":

"As former colleagues of Jian (our last show was in 2000), we are sickened and saddened by this week's news. We had no inkling that Jian engaged in this type of behaviour. We abhor the idea of a sexual relationship of any sort being entered into without full consent from both parties and condemn violence against women in any form. We wish only health and healing to everyone involved. We have no further comment on this matter at this time."

Ghomeshi was acquitted of five assault charges on March 24, 2016. On May 11, 2016, the Crown withdrew the last remaining charge after Ghomeshi signed a peace bond and apologized to the plaintiff.

Later projects
 Jian Ghomeshi worked for CBC Radio One, primarily as the host of the arts and cultural program Q until October 2014, when he was fired. He also wrote a book, 1982, published by Penguin Books.
 Murray Foster is part of the band Great Atomic Power, with Dave Matheson, Tory Cassis, Mark Mariash and Jason LaPrade.  He also performs in a vocal jazz standard group called The Lesters.  Most recently, Foster has been touring as part of Great Big Sea, replacing bass player and singer Darrell Power.
 Dave Matheson performs solo and with Murray Foster in Great Atomic Power.
 Mike Ford often performs in schools, singing his songs about the history of Canada.
 Murray Foster and Mike Ford formed The Cocksure Lads in 2011. They have released two albums and have performed live in the Toronto area. Dave Matheson also makes occasional appearances with The Cocksure Lads.

Band name
The name "Moxy Früvous" is a nonsense phrase, although the liner notes of their first CD Bargainville contained a faux-dictionary listing of definitions for früvous. The band was known to never provide a straight or consistent answer when defining the origin or meaning of the band's name.

In an interview with WBER radio in Rochester, New York, on November 23, 1999, Ghomeshi explained the band's name origin by saying that they were "trying to think of a name that wasn't easy to remember and didn't mean anything," satirically going against two conventions most bands might use in determining a band name. The band name also includes a (satirical) heavy metal umlaut.

Album discography
 Moxy Früvous (1992, demo, rare)
 Bargainville (1993)
 includes the single "King of Spain"
 Wood (1995)
 The 'b' Album (1996, b-sides and other oddities)
 You Will Go to the Moon (1997)
 Live Noise (1998, live)
 Thornhill (1999)
 The 'c' Album (2000, b-sides and other oddities)

References

External links
 Moxy Früvous Official website
 Moxy Früvous collection at the Internet Archive's live music archive
 
 Information on Murray Foster

Musical groups established in 1989
Musical groups disestablished in 2001
Musical groups from the Regional Municipality of York
Canadian folk rock groups
Canadian comedy musical groups
Canadian buskers
1989 establishments in Ontario
2001 disestablishments in Ontario
Musical groups from Toronto